Robert Nelson  (26 June 1913 – 3 June 1959) was the sixth Bishop of Middleton from 1958 until his death a year later.

Born on 26 June 1913 and educated at Carlisle Grammar School and  Leeds University, he was ordained in 1936. After  curacies at Grange-over-Sands and Leeds  he became Vicar of Barrow-in-Furness before a nine-year stint as  Rector of Liverpool. A noted broadcaster,  he died on 3 June 1959.

Notes

1913 births
People educated at Carlisle Grammar School
Alumni of the University of Leeds
Bishops of Middleton
1959 deaths
20th-century Church of England bishops